Mozaiq is the fourth studio album by the metal band, Blood Stain Child. It was released on July 18, 2007 in Japan and was released on 20 July 2007 in Europe. Mozaiq contains 11 tracks plus an extra track that differs; for Japan "Ez Do Dance" a cover after TRF and for Europe "Cosmic Highway".

Style 
Mozaiq is more euro-trance influenced than all their previous materials, stating that it "is really about breaking down the boundaries of what we refer to as Heavy Music". It contains more clean vocals, especially on "Neo-Gothic-Romance". The track "Metropolice" is built upon female vocal samples. Instrumentation is lower-paced than on their previous works, especially their debut album, and synths sometimes cross into industrial/eurodance territory. With the arrival of vocalist Sadew, original lead vocalist Ryo performs only backing vocals on the album in addition to maintaining his role as bassist.

Track listing

Videography 
A video for "Freedom" was shot which can be viewed . The video shows the band playing apparently in the dark at night near an enormous beacon. Towards the end of the video, it brightens up and turns into day.

Personnel 
 Sadew − lead vocals
 Ryu − lead guitar, backing vocals
 G.S.R − rhythm guitar
 Ryo − bass guitar, unclean backing vocals
 Aki − keyboards, synthesizers, programming, backing vocals
 Violator − drums, percussion

Additional musicians 
 Maripu - Female Vocals

Release history

References

External links 
 BSC official site

2007 albums
Blood Stain Child albums
Locomotive Music albums
Albums produced by Tue Madsen